The Leitrim Minor A Football Championship is a football competition between the top-tier teams in Minor Gaelic football in County Leitrim, Ireland. The Leitrim County Board of the Gaelic Athletic Association has organised it since 1929.

Melvin Gaels are the Minor A title holders (2016) defeating holders St Manchan's after a replay to win their first ever Minor A title. Lower-level teams play in the Leitrim Minor B Football Championship and up until 2012 the Minor C Football Championship, but due to rural teams amalgamating, the number of teams competing in the Minor A Football Championship has increased resulting in the removal of the C Championship.

The trophy presented to the winners is the O'Dolan Cup.

A Championship

Wins listed by club

B Championship

Wins listed by club

C Championship

Wins listed by club

Leitrim GAA club championships